In enzymology, a Mg2+-importing ATPase is an enzyme that catalyzes the chemical reaction

ATP + H2O + Mg2+out  ADP + phosphate + Mg2+in

The 3 substrates of this enzyme are ATP, H2O, and Mg2+, whereas its 3 products are ADP, phosphate, and Mg2+.

This enzyme belongs to the family of hydrolases, specifically those acting on acid anhydrides to catalyse transmembrane movement of substances. The systematic name of this enzyme class is ATP phosphohydrolase (Mg2+-importing).

The mgtA gene which encodes this enzyme is thought to be regulated by a magnesium responsive RNA element. A human enzyme was found in erythrocytes but the observation could not be confirmed.

References

 
 

EC 3.6.3
Enzymes of unknown structure